A  is a type of mat used as a flooring material in traditional Japanese-style rooms. Tatamis are made in standard sizes, twice as long as wide, about 0.9 m by 1.8 m depending on the region. In martial arts, tatami are the floor used for training in a dojo and for competition.

There are four warps per weft shed, two at each end (or sometimes two per shed, one at each end, to cut costs). The  (core) is traditionally made from sewn-together rice straw, but contemporary tatami sometimes have compressed wood chip boards or extruded polystyrene foam in their cores, instead or as well. The long sides are usually  with brocade or plain cloth, although some tatami have no edging.

History

The term tatami is derived from the verb , meaning 'to fold' or 'to pile'. This indicates that the early tatami were thin and could be folded up when not used or piled in layers. 

Tatami were originally a luxury item for the nobility. The lower classes had mat-covered earth floors. During the Heian period, when the shinden-zukuri architectural style of aristocratic residences was consummated, the flooring of shinden-zukuri palatial rooms were mainly wooden, and tatami were only used as seating for the highest aristocrats. 

In the Kamakura period, there arose the shoin-zukuri architectural style of residence for the samurai and priests who had gained power. This architectural style reached its peak of development in the Muromachi period, when tatami gradually came to be spread over whole rooms, beginning with small rooms.

It is said that prior to the mid-16th century, the ruling nobility and samurai slept on tatami or woven mats called , while commoners used straw mats or loose straw for bedding. Tatami were gradually popularized and reached the homes of commoners toward the end of the 17th century.

Houses built in Japan today often have very few tatami-floored rooms, if any. Having just one is not uncommon. The rooms having tatami flooring and other such traditional architectural features are referred to as nihonma or washitsu, "Japanese-style rooms".

Size

The size of tatami traditionally differs between regions in Japan:

 Kyoto: 0.955 m by 1.91 m, called  tatami
 Nagoya: 0.91 m by 1.82 m, called  tatami
 Tokyo: 0.88 m by 1.76 m, called  or  tatami

In terms of thickness, 5.5 cm is average for a Kyōma tatami, while 6.0 cm is the norm for a Kantōma tatami. Note that a shaku is almost the same length as one foot in the traditional English-American measurement system.

Alternatively, in terms of traditional Japanese area units, room area (and especially house floor area) is measured in terms of tsubo, where one tsubo is the area of two tatami mats (a square); formally 1 ken by 1 ken or a 1.81818 meter square, about 3.306 square meters.

Some common room sizes in the Nagoya region are:
 mats = 9 shaku × 9 shaku ≈ 2.73 m × 2.73 m
6 mats = 9 shaku × 12 shaku ≈ 2.73 m × 3.64 m
8 mats = 12 shaku × 12 shaku ≈ 3.64 m × 3.64 m

Shops were traditionally designed to be  mats, and tea rooms are frequently  mats.

Layout
There are rules concerning the number of tatami mats and the layout of the tatami mats in a room.    In the Edo period,  tatami arrangements and  tatami arrangements were distinctly differentiated, and the tatami accordingly would be rearranged depending on the occasion. In modern practice, the "auspicious" layout is ordinarily used. In this arrangement, the junctions of the tatami form a "T" shape; in the "inauspicious" arrangement, the tatami are in a grid pattern wherein the junctions form a "+" shape. An auspicious tiling often requires the use of  mats to tile a room. It is NP-complete to determine whether a large room has an auspicious arrangement using only full mats.

An inauspicious layout was used to avoid bringing bad fortune at inauspicious events, such as funerals.  However now it is widely associated with bad luck and avoided.

See also
 Higashiyama Bunka in Muromachi period

References

External links

Interior design
Japanese architectural features
Japanese home
Japanese rugs and carpets
Straw products
Units of area